S. Thomas' College, Gurutalawa is a private Christian school situated in Gurutalawa, in the Uva Province of Sri Lanka. It is an Anglican school administrated by the Church of Ceylon.

Administration
The College forms a branch of S. Thomas' College, Mount Lavinia, which is under the Anglican Church of Ceylon, is run by a Board of Governors which is chaired by the Anglican Bishop of Colombo, who is also known as the "Visitor of the College". The administration of the College in  itself is headed by a headmaster who is an Anglican priest. Admission to the College is at the sole discretion of the headmaster.

History 
S. Thomas' College, Gurutalawa was founded by Dr. R. L. Hayman in 1942, as a branch of S. Thomas' College, Mount Lavinia. A farm with some land and buildings was donated to the college by Mr. & Mrs. Leslie de Saram.

Due to the Japanese war threats to Colombo, during World War II, the State Council decided in February 1942 to close all schools in the Colombo District. There were over 700 boys at S. Thomas' College, Mount Lavinia and as the Warden explored possibilities of opening branches inland, Mr. and Mrs. Leslie De Seram made the generous offer of their  farm at Gurutalawa.

Current status 
The College is a fully fledged school catering to extra-curricular activities with a swimming pool and has facilities for nearly all sports including athletics, cricket, basketball, rugby,  volleyball, squash, soccer, table tennis, hockey, badminton, swimming as well as activities like scouting, hiking and trekking. There is also the encouragement for a variety of societies and clubs, debating, oratory, oriental dancing and music.

Headmasters

Notable alumni 

Bradmon Weerakoon - Civil Servant and served as the Secretary to the several Prime Ministers of Sri Lanka (Such as Sir.John Kotelawala, Solomon Bandaranaike, Wijayananda Dahanayake, Sirimavo Bandaranaike, Dudley Senanayake, Ranasinghe Premadasa, Dingiri Banda Wijetunga, Chandrika Kumaratunga & Ranil Wickremesinghe)
General Ranjan Wijeratne - Former Cabinet Minister of Foreign Affairs, Minister of State for Defense
Revd. Dr. Lakshman Wickremasinghe - Bishop in the Church of England and Human Rights activist
Buddhika Kurukularatne - Former Member of Parliament, Attorney at Law, social worker and author
Sarath Muttetuwegama - Former Member of Parliament for Kalawana Seat, Ratnapura District
Ananda Kumarasiri - Current Deputy Speaker of the Sri Lankan Parliament, Current member of the Sri Lankan Parliament for Wellawaya Seat, Monaragala District
Keerthi Thennakoon - Current Governor of the Central Province of Sri Lanka, Former Governor of the Southern Province of Sri Lanka
Jagath Pushpakumara - Former Minister of Coconut Development and Janatha Estate Development, Former Non-Cabinet Minister of Nation Building and Estate Infrastructure Development, Former Deputy Minister of Plantation Industries, Agriculture, Social Services, Samurdhi, Poverty Alleviation, Mahaweli Development, Livestock Development, Estate Infrastructure and Former Member of the Sri Lanka Parliament for Wellawaya Seat, Monaragala District
Dr.Frank de Silva - 24th Sri Lankan Inspector General of Police (IGP)
Ananda Dassanayake - Former Governor of the Uva Province of Sri Lanka & Former Member of the Sri Lanka Parliament
Clifford Ratwatte - Former Member of Parliament for Balangoda Seat, Former Parliamentary Secretary to the Minister of Agriculture, Food, Co-operatives and Fisheries, Former Chairman of the State Plantations Corporation and the Sri Lanka Tea Board & The younger brother of Late Prime Minister of Ceylon, Sirimavo Bandaranaike Ratwatte
Nalanda Ellawala - Former Member of parliament for Ratnapura District & Former Member of Sabaragamuwa Provincial Council
Keheliya Rambukwella - Current Member of the Sri Lanka Parliament for Kandy District, Former Minister of Mass Media and Information, Former Member of The United National Party

References

External links 
 
 Official website of S. Thomas' College Gurutalawa Old Boys Association
Official website of S. Thomas' College Gurutalawa '62 Group
Official website of S. Thomas' College, Mt Lavinia
 Great strides of wartime school in the hills
S. Thomas' College
stcguru.org-
Reflections on the Diamond Jubilee of S. Thomas' College Gurutalawa
Mrs Mary Hayman
Biography of an old boy
STC OBA Australia
STC OBA Canada
Old Thomians

1942 establishments in Ceylon
Boarding schools in Sri Lanka
Church of Ceylon schools in the Diocese of Colombo
Educational institutions established in 1942
Private schools in Sri Lanka
Schools in Badulla District